is a 1993 Japanese film directed by Hideyuki Hirayama.

Cast
 Kenjiro Nashimoto as Yohei Nozaki
 Tomoko Otakara as Akemi Kikushima
 Yumiko Fujita as Dir. Kambayashi

References

External links
 

1993 films
Films directed by Hideyuki Hirayama
Japanese drama films
1990s Japanese films